Đặng Phong (1937–2010) was a Vietnamese economic historian.

Born in Hà Tây Province, Đặng Phong graduated from Hanoi University in 1960 then National Economics University in 1964. He then worked as researcher at Vietnam Institute of Economics from 1961 to 2000. He also taught at the Hanoi University of Business and Technology from 1996 to 2009 and was a visiting lecturer to various universities outside Vietnam. Throughout his life, he wrote more than 30 academic works, many of which focus on Vietnam's economic history, its centrally planned economy period and its transition to market economy. He is regarded by some to have been "a living dictionary of Vietnam's economy" and a "top economic historian".

Early life 
Đặng Phong was born on November 4th, 1937 in Hà Tây. He had a Bachelor of Arts in history at Hanoi University in 1960 and graduated from National Economics University, Planning Faculty in 1964.

Career 

Đặng Phong worked as an economist specializing in economic history for Vietnam Institute of Economics. He also served as Vice Editor-in-chief of journal Tạp chí Thị trường & Giá cả (Markets and Prices Review) during 1983–1995, collaborator of French National Centre for Scientific Research, Chairman of the Euro Economic Subcommittee – Viet III, Amsterdam in 1997, consultant of Cuban Academy of Sciences. In 1988, State Committee for Markets and Prices assigned him to compete for a scholarship to France, which he won. He spent some time studying at Institut Agricole Méditerranéen in Montpellier.

Researching economic history 

While working on his book Kinh tế thời nguyên thủy ở Việt Nam, his wife sold emptied milk cans to buy champagne, rolls of cotton fabric, chocolate. Đặng Phong then brought these to South Vietnam, selling them to earn living income. Upon Vietnam's reunification in 1975, he conducted research on Vietnam's economic history using the archive left behind by South Vietnam government. This is their researches, plans and strategies on developing agriculture, industry and education which Đặng Phong deemed to be detailed and can serve as part of his own post-war development plan for Vietnam.

His book Lịch sử kinh tế Việt Nam was published in 2000, in a review for Lao Động the newspaper, Y Trang considered Đặng Phong so far has been a non-notable historian, attributing the causes to economic history field not being much appreciated. Throughout his life, Đặng Phong wrote many books and articles on Vietnam's economic history, economy of South Vietnam, the centrally planned economy period and the transition period to market economy. The book Tư duy Kinh tế Việt Nam was published in 2008, in which Đặng Phong presented a systemic arrangement of Vietnam's economic mindset developments during 1975–1989 together with critical documents from the Central Committee. According to Đặng Phong, "economic mindset decides economic policies. Many of Vietnam's ups and downs depend on economic mindset." and the biggest difficulty is lacking research materials. In a review for Lao Động the newspaper, Y Trang described Đặng Phong as a "lively and quite contemporary historian".

Having dedicated more than 40 years for academic researching, Đặng Phong is called "a living dictionary of Vietnam's economy". Trần Phương saw Đặng Phong as someone with "serious scientific manner", "digging diligently to the roots of the events in order to represent historical events faithfully". Nguyễn Gia Kiểng praised the diversity of documents, "accompanied by accurate and sharp judgments". During the preparation process, Đặng Phong collected documents and had access to high-ranking politicians of the state. Economic professor Nguyễn Thị Hiền noted Đặng Phong for having "a rich literary mind and a very sharp synthesis ability".

Researching history and teaching 
Đặng Phong's book Chuyện Thăng Long – Hà Nội qua một đường phố was published in 2010. It is a research on Lê Duẩn street in Hanoi, inspired by the book Histoire de Hanoi by French historian Philippe Papin. Writing for Tuổi Trẻ Online, Thu Hà found the familiar "calmness, depth of Đặng Phong's scholarly and commentary style" can still be found in this book, yet in a "softer, more revealing" way. Đặng Phong expressed his wish that the book become an anniversary work for the Millennial Anniversary of Hanoi (which was later fulfilled).

Đặng Phong taught at Đại học Kinh doanh và Công nghệ Hà Nội (HaNoi University of Business and Technology). He was also visiting lecturer at University of Aix-en-Provence (2007), University of Cambridge (2005), University of Macquarie, Sydney (1996, 2000), The Australian National University (1994), University of Irvine California (1994). After being called "professor" by Vietnamese media multiple times, Đặng Phong clarified in 2017 that he is not a professor and has never been granted professor title.

Family and death 
Đặng Phong's brother is Đặng Vũ. His daughter is Đặng Lê Chi.

Đặng Phong died of illness on August 20th, 2010. In December 2010, Chuyện Thăng Long – Hà Nội qua một đường phố was launched on 100th day in memoriam of him. Prior to his death, he expressed his desire to write a book series about economic history and economic mindset of Vietnam with other Vietnamese economic historians.

Legacy 

One year after his death, Phan Châu Trinh Culture Foundation, Tri Thức Publishing House and Vietnam Institute for Economic & Policy Research co-organized a talk show in memory of Đặng Phong. The talk show affirms his contributions to the economic history research field and confirms that his influence will continue to spread to younger academic generations.

Bibliography 
Đặng Phong dedicated more than 40 years of his life on researching. Many of his works are published as physical books, while many other are preserved. 

 Kinh tế thời nguyên thủy ở Việt Nam (The Primitive Economy in Vietnam), NXB Khoa học Xã hội, 1970 
 21 năm viện trợ Mỹ ở Việt Nam (Twenty-One Years of American Aid in (South) Vietnam), NXB Thông Tin, 1991 
 Thị trường và giá cả Việt Nam từ thế kỷ XIX đến nay: Đề tài nghiên cứu khoa học cấp bộ (Markets and prices in Vietnam from nineteenth century to now). Hanoi: Viện Nghiên cứu Khoa học thị trường và giá cả, 1992 
 Authority relations and economic decision-making in Vietnam: an historical perspective (co-authored with Melanie Beresford), Copenhagen: Nordic Institute of Asian Studies, 1998 
 Economic Transition in Vietnam: Aid and Trade in the Demise of a Centrally Planned Economy (co-authored with Melanie Beresford). Cheltenham, UK and Northampton MA, USA: Edward Elgar, 2000 
 Lịch sử kinh tế Việt Nam 1945–2000, tập 1 1945–1954 (Economic History of Vietnam 1945–2000, Vol. 1: 1945-1954). Hanoi: NXB Khoa học Xã hội, 2002 
Lịch sử Ngân hàng Ngoại thương Việt Nam 1963–2003 (History of Vietcombank 1963–2003), 2003
 So sánh đổi mới kinh tế Việt Nam và cải cách kinh tế Trung Quốc (Comparison of Economic Reform Between China and Vietnam) (co-authored), 2003
 Kinh tế miền Nam thời kỳ 1955–1975 (Economy of the South 1955–1975). Hanoi: NXB Khoa học Xã hội, 2004 
  Lịch sử kinh tế Việt Nam 1945–2000, tập 2 1955–1975 (Economic History of Vietnam, 1945–2000, Vol. 2: 1955-1975). Hanoi: NXB Khoa học Xã hội, 2005 
Lịch sử kinh tế Việt Nam 1945–2000, tập 3 1975–2000 (Economic History of Vietnam, 1945–2000, Vol. 3: 1975–2000)
 30 năm Vietcombank thành phố Hồ Chí Minh, 1976-2006 (30 years of Vietcombank Ho Chi Minh City 1976-2006). Hanoi: NXB Chính trị Quốc gia Sự thật, 2006
 Những bước đột phá của An Giang trên con đường đổi mới kinh tế (Break-Through Steps of An Giang on the Way to Reform) (co-authored with Đỗ Hoài Nam), 2006 
 Long An – mũi đột phá vào kinh tế thị trường (Long An, a Break-Through into Market Economy) (co-authored with Đỗ Hoài Nam). Hanoi: NXB Khoa học Xã hội, 2007 
Lịch sử Ngân hàng đầu tư và phát triển Việt Nam, 1957-2012: sơ thảo (History of the Vietnam Investment and Development Bank, 1957–2007: draft) (co-authored with Trần Đình Thiên). Hanoi: NXB Chính trị Quốc gia Sự thật), 2007
 Tư duy Kinh tế Việt Nam – Chặng đường gian nan và ngoạn mục 1975–1989 (Vietnam's Economic Mindset: A Daunting and Spectacular Road, 1975–1989), NXB Tri thức, 2008 
5 đường mòn Hồ Chí Minh (The Five Ho Chi Minh Trails). NXB Tri thức, 2008 
 Tư duy kinh tế Việt Nam 1975–1989 – Nhật ký thời bao cấp (Economic mindset of Vietnam 1975–1989 – Diary of Subsidy Economy period). NXB Tri thức, 2009 
"Phá rào" trong kinh tế vào đêm trước Đổi mới ('Fence breaking' in the Economic Sphere on the Eve of Đổi mới). Hanoi: NXB Tri thức, 2009 
 Những mũi đột phá trong kinh tế: thời trước Đổi Mới (Breakthroughs in economy: before Đổi Mới) (co-authored with Đỗ Hoài Nam). Hanoi: NXB Khoa học Xã hội, 2009 
 Chuyện Thăng Long – Hà Nội qua một đường phố (Stories of Thăng Long – Ha Noi in a single street), NXB Tri thức, 2010 
Biên niên các sự kiện kinh tế Việt Nam, 1975-2008 (Chronology of economic events of Vietnam 1975-2008) (co-authored with Trần Đình Thiên). Hanoi: NXB Khoa học Xã hội, 2012
 Vietnam: Le moment moderniste (co-authored). Aix-en-Provence: Presses universitaires de Provence, 2017. 
 Lịch sử Ngân hàng thương mại cổ phần đầu tư và phát triển Việt Nam, 1957–2017 (History of BIDV, 1957–2017) (co-authored with Trần Đình Thiên). Hanoi: NXB Chính trị Quốc gia Sự thật, 2017.

Notes

References

20th-century Vietnamese historians
1937 births
Vietnamese economists
2010 deaths
21st-century Vietnamese historians